Biz China can refer to:
 Biz China (CCTV), a China business news program on CCTV International
 Biz China (CRI), a China business news program on China Radio International